General Hays may refer to:

Alexander Hays (1819–1864), Union Army brigadier general and brevet major general
Anna Mae Hays (1920–2018), U.S. Army brigadier general
George Price Hays (1892–1978), U.S. Army lieutenant general
Harry T. Hays (1820–1876), Confederate States Army brigadier general
Silas B. Hays (1902–1964), U.S. Army major general
William Hays (general) (1819–1875), Union Army brigadier general

See also
General Hay (disambiguation)
General Hayes (disambiguation)